James E. Peterson (born January 20, 1950) is a former National Football League linebacker who played from 1974 to 1976 for the Los Angeles Rams and Tampa Bay Buccaneers. He attended Crawford High School, then Mesa Community College and eventually San Diego State University before being drafted by the Rams in the 6th round, 133rd overall, of the 1973 NFL Draft.

References

Living people
1950 births
Players of American football from San Diego
Los Angeles Rams players
Tampa Bay Buccaneers players
American football linebackers
San Diego State Aztecs football players